Harry Kurschat (3 November 1930 – 21 January 2022) was a boxer from Germany, who competed in the lightweight division during his career as an amateur for West Germany. He was born and died in Berlin.

Amateur career
Kurschat was the German amateur lightweight champion 1953, 1954, and 1956, as well as the European amateur champion in 1955.  He was the Olympic silver medalist at 1956 Melbourne Olympic games in the lightweight class for United Team of Germany.

Olympic results 
 1st round bye
 Defeated Celedonio Espinosa (Philippines) points
 Defeated Zygmunt Milewski (Poland) KO 3
 Defeated Tony Byrne (Ireland) points
 Lost to Richard McTaggart (Great Britain) points

References

External links
 

1930 births
2022 deaths
Boxers from Berlin
Lightweight boxers
German male boxers
Olympic boxers of the United Team of Germany
Olympic silver medalists for the United Team of Germany
Olympic medalists in boxing
Boxers at the 1956 Summer Olympics
Medalists at the 1956 Summer Olympics